Project Xanadu was the first hypertext project, founded in 1960 by Ted Nelson. Administrators of Project Xanadu have declared it superior to the World Wide Web, with the mission statement: "Today's popular software simulates paper. The World Wide Web (another imitation of paper) trivialises our original hypertext model with one-way ever-breaking links and no management of version or contents."

Wired magazine published an article called "The Curse of Xanadu", calling Project Xanadu "the longest-running vaporware story in the history of the computer industry". The first attempt at implementation began in 1960, but it was not until 1998 that an incomplete implementation was released. A version described as "a working deliverable", OpenXanadu, was made available in 2014.

History 
Nelson's vision was for a "digital repository scheme for world-wide electronic publishing". Nelson states that the idea began in 1960, when he was a student at Harvard University. He proposed a machine-language program which would store and display documents, together with the ability to perform edits. This was different from a word processor (which was not invented yet) in that the functionality would have included visual comparisons of different versions of the document, a concept Nelson would later call "intercomparison".

On top of this basic idea, Nelson wanted to facilitate nonsequential writing, in which the reader could choose their own path through an electronic document. He built upon this idea in a paper to the Association for Computing Machinery (ACM) in 1965, calling the new idea "zippered lists". These zippered lists would allow compound documents to be formed from pieces of other documents, a concept named transclusion. In 1967, while working for Harcourt, Brace, he named his project Xanadu, in honour of the poem "Kubla Khan" by Samuel Taylor Coleridge.

Nelson's talk at the ACM predicted many of the features of today's hypertext systems, but at the time, his ideas had little impact. Though researchers were intrigued by his ideas, Nelson lacked the technical knowledge to demonstrate that the ideas could be implemented.

1970s 
Ted Nelson published his ideas in his 1974 book Computer Lib/Dream Machines and the 1981 Literary Machines.

Computer Lib/Dream Machines is written in a non-sequential fashion: it is a compilation of Nelson's thoughts about computing, among other topics, in no particular order.  It contains two books, printed back to back, to be flipped between. Computer Lib contains Nelson's thoughts on topics which angered him, while Dream Machines discusses his hopes for the potential of computers to assist the arts.

In 1972, Cal Daniels completed the first demonstration version of the Xanadu software on a computer Nelson had rented for the purpose, though Nelson soon ran out of money.  In 1974, with the advent of computer networking, Nelson refined his thoughts about Xanadu into a centralised source of information, calling it a "docuverse".

In the summer of 1979, Nelson led the latest group of his followers, Roger Gregory, Mark S. Miller and Stuart Greene, to Swarthmore, Pennsylvania. In a house rented by Greene, they hashed out their ideas for Xanadu; but at the end of the summer the group went their separate ways.  Miller and Gregory created an addressing system based on transfinite numbers which they called tumblers, which allowed any part of a file to be referenced.

1980s 
The group continued their work, almost to the point of bankruptcy. In 1983, however, Nelson met John Walker, founder of Autodesk, at The Hackers Conference, a conference originally for the people mentioned in Steven Levy's Hackers, and the group started working on Xanadu with Autodesk's financial backing.

According to economist Robin Hanson, in 1990 the first known corporate prediction market was used at Xanadu. Employees and consultants used it for example to bet on the cold fusion controversy at the time.

While at Autodesk, the group, led by Gregory, completed a version of the software, written in the C programming language, though the software did not work the way they wanted. However, this version of Xanadu was successfully demonstrated at The Hackers Conference and generated considerable interest. Then a newer group of programmers, hired from Xerox PARC, used the problems with this software as justification to rewrite the software in Smalltalk. This effectively split the group into two factions, and the decision to rewrite put a deadline imposed by Autodesk out of the team's reach. In August 1992, Autodesk divested the Xanadu group, which became the Xanadu Operating Company, which struggled due to internal conflicts and lack of investment.

Charles S. Smith, the founder of a company called Memex (named after a hypertext system proposed by Vannevar Bush), hired many of the Xanadu programmers (including lead architects Mark S. Miller, Dean Tribble and Ravi Pandya) and licensed the Xanadu technology, though Memex soon faced financial difficulties, and the then-unpaid programmers left, taking the computers with them (the programmers were eventually paid). At around this time, Tim Berners-Lee was developing the World Wide Web. When the Web began to see large growth that Xanadu did not, Nelson's team grew defensive in the supposed rivalry that was emerging, but that they were losing. The 1995 Wired Magazine article "The Curse of Xanadu," provoked a harsh rebuttal from Nelson, but contention largely faded as the Web dominated Xanadu.

1990s 
In 1998, Nelson released the source code to Xanadu as Project Udanax, in the hope that the techniques and algorithms used could help to overturn some software patents.

2000s 
In 2007, Project Xanadu released XanaduSpace 1.0.

2010s 
A version described as "a working deliverable", OpenXanadu, was made available on the World Wide Web in 2014. It is called open because "you can see all the parts", but  the site stated that it was "not yet open source". On the site, the creators claim that Tim Berners-Lee stole their idea, and that the World Wide Web is a "bizarre structure created by arbitrary initiatives of varied people and it has a terrible programming language" and that Web security is a "complex maze". They go on to say that Hypertext is designed to be paper, and that the World Wide Web allows nothing more than dead links to other dead pages.

In 2016, Ted Nelson was interviewed by Werner Herzog in his documentary, Lo and Behold, Reveries of the Connected World. "By some, he was labeled insane for clinging on," Herzog said. "To us, you appear to be the only one who is clinically sane." Nelson was delighted by the praise. "No one has ever said that before!" said Nelson. "Usually it's the other way around."

Original 17 rules 
 Every Xanadu server is uniquely and securely identified.
 Every Xanadu server can be operated independently or in a network.
 Every user is uniquely and securely identified.
 Every user can search, retrieve, create and store documents.
 Every document can consist of any number of parts each of which may be of any data type.
 Every document can contain links of any type including virtual copies ("transclusions") to any other document in the system accessible to its owner.
 Links are visible and can be followed from all endpoints.
 Permission to link to a document is explicitly granted by the act of publication.
 Every document can contain a royalty mechanism at any desired degree of granularity to ensure payment on any portion accessed, including virtual copies ("transclusions") of all or part of the document.
 Every document is uniquely and securely identified.
 Every document can have secure access controls.
 Every document can be rapidly searched, stored and retrieved without user knowledge of where it is physically stored.
 Every document is automatically moved to physical storage appropriate to its frequency of access from any given location.
 Every document is automatically stored redundantly to maintain availability even in case of a disaster.
 Every Xanadu service provider can charge their users at any rate they choose for the storage, retrieval and publishing of documents.
 Every transaction is secure and auditable only by the parties to that transaction.
 The Xanadu client–server communication protocol is an openly published standard. Third-party software development and integration is encouraged.

See also 
 Enfilade (Xanadu)
 Hypermedia
 ENQUIRE
 Interpedia
 American Information Exchange
 Tent (protocol)
In addition to the Web, the Project Xanadu FAQ suggests other hypermedia systems which are similar, including HyperWave (or Hyper-G) and:
Microcosm (hypermedia system)
IBM Notes (descendant of Notes on PLATO (computer system), featured in Nelson's Computer Lib)
 Wiki
 Memex
 ipfs

Footnotes

References 
 The Magical Place of Literary Memory: Xanadu in Screening the Past, July 2005 by Belinda Barnet
 The Curse of Xanadu, Wired feature on Nelson and Xanadu
 Published comments on that Wired article, including one from Ted Nelson, Full text of Ted Nelson's comment
 Errors in "The Curse of Xanadu" by Theodor Holm Nelson, Project Xanadu

External links 
 
 Xanadu Australia an active site

 "Xanadu Products Due Next Year," by Jeff Merron. BIX online news report from the West Coast Computer Faire, 1988
 Ted Nelson Possiplex Internet Archive book reading video
 Xanadu Hypertext Documents, Design Document from 1984

Content management systems
Ted Nelson
Vaporware
Hypertext
Computer-related introductions in 1960
Software projects